The Diocese of Helsingør (Danish: Helsingør Stift) is a diocese within the Evangelical Lutheran Church of Denmark. It comprises the Danish Capital Region except for the core municipalities of Copenhagen, Frederiksberg, Tårnby and Dragør. Disjoined from the Diocese of Copenhagen on 1 January 1961, it is the most recently established of the 10 dioceses within the Danish state church. The main church is Saint Olaf's Church in Helsingør.

The current bishop is Peter Birch who succeeded Lise-Lotte Rebel on 1 April 2021.

List of Bishops 
J.B. Leer-Andersen, 1961–1980
Johannes Johansen, 1980–1995
Lise-Lotte Rebel, 1995–2021
Peter Birch, 2021–present

References

Church of Denmark dioceses
Diocese of Helsingør
1961 establishments in Denmark